The Ford Fordor, known officially as the Ford C11ADF, Station Wagon/Heavy Utility, 4x2, was a militarized station wagon used in the North African Campaign of World War II. They often had roof hatches and a few roofless versions were also built, some being equipped with features similar to a convertible. These saw use as cargo vans, military transporters and staff cars (depending on the variation).

The C11 was based on the bodyshell of the contemporary American 1940s Ford station wagon but was based on a different heavier chassis designed for off-road use and tougher conditions. These vehicles were produced by Ford of Canada and were also built from knock-down kits in the United Kingdom (Dagenham) and Australia. It used a version of the Ford V8 engine which was also used in the British Universal Carrier and the Fordson WOT truck, allowing for much parts commonality and interchangeability between the Commonwealth allies, something that was seen as very practical advantage at the time.

The C11 can be considered one of the "precursors" to the modern Crossover SUV as it combined the mechanics and styling of a passenger car with off-road capabilities. Production of the C11 stopped in 1945 when the war ended but in the United Kingdom it continued to be produced in limited numbers for the civilian market in a somewhat modified and modernized version until 1947. This (alongside the somewhat smaller post-war Pilot) was the last large American-derived car produced by Ford in Britain as the market later focused on much smaller European-designed cars. Consequently Ford would not market another off-road oriented van in European markets until nearly 40 years later with the 4x4 variation of its popular Transit range.

References

External links
 1941 Ford C11ADF, Canadian War Museum, by Andy Bass - photo gallery

World War II military vehicles
World War II vehicles of the United Kingdom
Soft-skinned vehicles
Off-road vehicles
Ford vehicles